The Custos Rotulorum of Fermanagh was the highest civil officer in County Fermanagh.

Incumbents

 1661-?1691 Sir John Cole, 1st Baronet (died 1691) 
 Sir Arthur Brooke, 1st Baronet (died 1785) 
 1769–1803 William Cole, 1st Earl of Enniskillen
 1803-?1840 John Willoughby Cole, 2nd Earl of Enniskillen (died 1840)

For later custodes rotulorum, see Lord Lieutenant of Fermanagh

References

Fermanagh